Literati may refer to:
Intellectuals or those who love, read, and comment on literature
The scholar-official or literati of imperial/medieval China
Literati painting, also known as the southern school of painting, developed by Chinese literati
The literati style of bonsai, consisting of thin, elegant trees in the calligraphic style of literati painting
Confucianism, known as the school of literati
The game Literati, a variant of Scrabble developed by Yahoo! Games
Literati (book club), children's book club